Ivan Havrylovych Bohdan (29 February 1928 – 25 December 2020) was a Soviet and Ukrainian wrestler. He was born in Dmytro-Bilivka, Ukrainian SSR. He won an Olympic gold medal in Greco-Roman wrestling in 1960, competing for the Soviet Union. He won gold medals at the 1958 and 1961 World Wrestling Championships.

References

External links
UWW Profile

1928 births
2020 deaths
Communist Party of the Soviet Union members
Medalists at the 1960 Summer Olympics
Olympic gold medalists for the Soviet Union
Olympic medalists in wrestling
Olympic wrestlers of the Soviet Union
Honoured Masters of Sport of the USSR
Recipients of the Order of Merit (Ukraine), 2nd class
Recipients of the Order of Merit (Ukraine), 3rd class
Recipients of the Order of the Red Banner of Labour
Soviet male sport wrestlers
Ukrainian male sport wrestlers
Wrestlers at the 1960 Summer Olympics
Sportspeople from Mykolaiv Oblast